The Admiralty Navy Band of the Leningrad Naval Base (Russian: Адмиралтейский оркестр Ленинградской военно-морской базы) is a Russian military band based in Saint Petersburg. It was founded early in the 18th century about the same time as the Russian Navy itself. The band's chief conductor and director of music is Captain 3rd rank Valentin Lyashenko, who leads the band under the instruction of the Military Band Service of the Armed Forces of Russia. 

The band has toured Europe and performed for visiting heads of state. It has also had a number of guest conductors, both military and civilian. William Malambri, a music professor at Winthrop University in Rock Hill, South Carolina, U.S.A., served as guest conductor of the Admiralty Navy Band for a concert in 2004 at Shostakovich Hall.

Principal Conductors

 G. Stepanov (1938-1939)
 S. Rotmil (1939-1940)
 A. Tsvetkov (1940-1949)
 S. Polyansky (1950-1959)
 V. Barsegyan (1960-1975)
 M. Borzhkov (1976-1977)
 N. Idzon (1978-1984)
 Alexei Karabanov (1985–2008)
 Valentin Lyashchenko (2008-2021)
 Nikita Ignatov (since June 2021)

References

MilitaryMusic.com E-NEWS – June 19, 2002 – Band Profile: The Saint Petersburg Admiralty Navy Band

External links
Admiralty Navy Band of Russia Official site, in English.
Admiralty Navy Band of Russia Official site, in Russian.

Russian military bands
Russian Navy
1700s establishments in Russia
Soviet Navy
Musical groups established in the 18th century